Arıcak District is a district of Elazığ Province of Turkey. Its seat is the town Arıcak. Its area is 354 km2, and its population is 13,732 (2021).

Composition
There are 4 municipalities in Arıcak District:
Arıcak
Bükardı
Erimli
Üçocak

There are 10 villages in Arıcak District:

 Bozçavuş
 Çavuşdere
 Çevrecik
 Erbağı
 Göründü
 Kambertepe
 Karakaş
 Küplüce
 Ormanpınar
 Yoğunbilek

References

Districts of Elazığ Province